Anastasia Baranova (born 23 April 1989) is a Russian actress, best known for her starring roles as Jennifer "Scout" Lauer on the television series Scout's Safari and as Addison "Addy" Carver on the Syfy series Z Nation.

Biography 

Baranova was born in Moscow, Russia, in what was then part of the Soviet Union. As a child, she began modeling in Moscow. In 1998, Baranova and her mother, Ata, moved from Russia to Minnesota in the United States, where she continued to model. In 2000, they moved to California, where Baranova began her acting career. To learn the English language, she used the JumpStart CD-ROM series and took speech and singing classes. She is fluent in both Russian and English, and studied at Chapman University.

She is a graduate of the Los Angeles-based school The Acting Corps. , she lives in Los Angeles, California.

Career 
Baranova began her acting career in 2002 with a small speaking role on the Disney Channel series Lizzie McGuire. She then won the lead role for the Discovery Kids/NBC television series Scout's Safari, playing the character Jennifer "Scout" Lauer. Filming began in July 2002, and primarily took place at locations around South Africa. The series ran from October 2002 to February 2004, lasting two seasons and 26 episodes.

Baranova has had one- or two-episode appearances on several television series, including Sons of Anarchy, Joan of Arcadia, Veronica Mars, Drake & Josh, 7th Heaven, and Malcolm in the Middle. She also appeared in the 2007 film Rise: Blood Hunter. In 2010, she made an appearance on the HDNet series Svetlana.

In 2014, Baranova joined the cast of the Syfy post-apocalyptic horror-comedy-drama series Z Nation, playing the role of Addison "Addy" Carver.

In the 2019 video game Metro Exodus she voiced the character of Katya.

Filmography

References

External links 
 

1989 births
Living people
Chapman University alumni
Russian emigrants to the United States
Russian child actresses
Russian film actresses
Russian television actresses
21st-century American women